Sead Čaušević (born 15 September 1949) is a Bosnian politician who served as the Prime Minister of Tuzla Canton for three years until his forced resignation in 2014, during the violent anti-government protests and riots in Bosnia and Herzegovina.

Biography
Čaušević was born in Tuzla in 1949. He completed gymnasium in Gračanica in 1968 and graduated from the Faculty of Law in the University of Sarajevo in 1972. His political career began in 1973 when he became a member of the municipal court in Gračanica.

In January 2014, Čaušević said that his salary was the fourth highest in the Tuzla Canton.

2014 riots and resignation
On 6 February 2014, when violent anti-government protests and riots broke out across Bosnia and Herzegovina, Čaušević said that he felt his life was "in danger". Čaušević was forced to resign as Prime Minister of Tuzla Canton on 7 February 2014, amid countrywide riots. It was reported that after resigning, he left Tuzla for the Bosnian capital Sarajevo. He was succeeded as Prime Minister by Bahrija Umihanić, who was appointed to the post on 26 March 2014.

References

1949 births
Living people
Politicians from Tuzla
Bosniaks of Bosnia and Herzegovina
Bosnia and Herzegovina Muslims
Bosniak politicians
University of Sarajevo alumni